NGC 5112 is a barred spiral galaxy in the constellation Canes Venatici. This galaxy is in close physical proximity to the edge-on dwarf spiral NGC 5107.

References

External links

NGC 5112
Canes Venatici
5112
08403
46671